Tricholoma cavipes is an agaric fungus of the genus Tricholoma. Found in Sabah, Malaysia, it was described as new to science in 1994 by English mycologist E.J.H. Corner.

See also
List of Tricholoma species

References

cavipes
Fungi described in 1994
Fungi of Asia
Taxa named by E. J. H. Corner